The 1853 New Jersey gubernatorial election was held on November 1, 1853. Democratic nominee Rodman M. Price defeated Whig nominee Joel Haywood with 52.60% of the vote.

General election

Candidates
Rodman M. Price, Democratic
Joel Haywood, Whig

Results

References

1853
New Jersey
1853 New Jersey elections
November 1853 events